Qui-Gon & Obi-Wan: Last Stand on Ord Mantell is a three-part comics series written by Ryder Windham, and published by Dark Horse Comics between December 2000 and March 2001. The series is set five years before Episode I – The Phantom Menace, and 37 years before Episode IV – A New Hope. The story features Qui-Gon Jinn and Obi-Wan Kenobi, who are sent into deep space to search for a valuable cargo freighter when it fails to reach its destination on the planet Coruscant.

Qui-Gon & Obi-Wan: The Aurorient Express is a two-part comics series written by Mike Kennedy, and published by Dark Horse Comics between February 2002 and June 2002. The series is set six years before The Phantom Menace, and 38 years before A New Hope. The story features Qui-Gon Jinn and Obi-Wan Kenobi. A luxury cloud cruiser has slipped out of control and is going to crash over Yorn Skot. The two Jedi must board the runaway ship and regain control.

Last Stand on Ord Mantell summary 

Baroness Omnino has come to the planet Coruscant to negotiate trade routes from her planet Vena. Qui-Gon Jinn and his padawan Obi-Wan Kenobi stop an assassination attempt on her life, made by a palace guard that is mind-controlled. Despite distrusting the Jedi after her husband's death, she summons Obi-Wan to be her personal protection. As they are negotiating this, a distress signal is discovered from Baron Sando's - her son's - freighter, light-years off-course, and she sends them to investigate.

At Baron Sando's ship, Qui-Gon and Obi-Wan discover everyone on board dead from an attack from a captive Mantellian Savrip, a large reptilian creature. They discover that the ship visited the planet Ord Mantell, so they head there.

On Ord Mantell, Qui-Gon uses a mind-trick on the spaceport officer to find out that Baron Sando's ship visited Bold Moisture Plant. On their arrival at the moisture plant, they are attacked by many droids and after they destroy most of them, a man comes out and deactivates the droids. The man introduces himself as Orin Bold and explains that the droids are for protection from Taxer Sundown, who has taken over every other moisture plant and is trying to overtake Orin's plant too. There are rumours that Sundown is a Jedi. Baron Sando's freighter did not land here but at a nearby colony which is in Sundown's territory. Orin's daughter Nella volunteers to take them as she is tired of Sundown's rule.

She takes them to her flyer, which to Obi-Wan's surprise is an extremely rare one but she explains that she found it abandoned by local miner. On their way to the colony they fly past a group of Mantellian Savrips, but Qui-Gon stops her from killing them with the flyer guns. Arriving at the colony, they are confronted by a hologram of Taxer Sundown who tells them they shouldn't have come, and they are ambushed by the colonists who are wielding lightsabers for trainees. Nella is kidnapped by a flyer and the attackers suddenly stop - they were being mind-controlled. They get information about Sundown's plans, Obi-Wan is sent after him at Orin Bold's plant and Qui-Gon goes after Nella's kidnappers.

Qui-Con follows the kidnapper's flyer trail and discovers it destroyed by Savrips. He suspects Nella is still alive, so he follows the tracks to a Savrip camp. He finds her in a hut but they are discovered by a Savrip. One of the Savrips has learned the common tongue and explains that Sundown is enslaving them and blaming his massacres on them. They decide to all try and meet with Sundown's transport.

Back at Orin Bold's plant, it is revealed that Nella's flyer is from Sundown and that they were mind-controlled into believing it was from a miner, and they have been trafficking skimmed credits for him the whole time. Obi-Wan is discovered and in the scuffle, Orin hits Sundown over the head with his crutch and breaks Sundown's mind-control device that he was wearing. Sundown escapes in Nella's flyer and heads to the transport area.

At the transport area near the colony Sundown is found to have crashed and died with a broken neck. The transport arrives and Baroness Omnino steps off. She has Chancellor Valorum hostage and explains that everything was fabricated so she could have access to Coruscant. She wants the Savrips for meat, not slaves. Appealing to her ego, Qui-Gon catches her off-guard, chopping off her head revealing another mind-control device. The colonists arrive and start shooting at the Savrips but Qui-Gon defuses the situation, and, pending a Jedi investigation, all is resolved.

Collections
Omnibus: Rise of the Sith

External links

Comics based on Star Wars
Dark Horse Comics limited series